Stan Tormey (10 July 1916 – 8 August 1971) was an  Australian rules footballer who played with St Kilda in the Victorian Football League (VFL).

Notes

External links 

1916 births
1971 deaths
Australian rules footballers from Victoria (Australia)
St Kilda Football Club players